The 2006 BMW Open was an Association of Tennis Professionals men's tennis tournament held in Munich, Germany. The tournament was held from 1 May until 8 May 2006. Fifth-seeded Olivier Rochus won the singles title.

Finals

Singles

 Olivier Rochus defeated  Kristof Vliegen 6–4, 6–2
 It was Rochus' only title of the year and the 4th of his career.

Doubles

 Andrei Pavel /  Alexander Waske defeated  Alexander Peya /  Björn Phau 6–4, 6–2
 It was Pavel's 3rd title of the year and the 8th of his career. It was Waske's 2nd title of the year and the 2nd of his career.

References

External links 
Association of Tennis Professionals (ATP) – tournament profile

 
BMW Open
Bavarian International Tennis Championships